Painted Desert Serenade is the debut studio album by American pianist/singer-songwriter Joshua Kadison, released in 1993 on SBK (a subsidiary of Capitol Records). It features two singles, both of which reached the top 30 on the US Billboard Hot 100: "Jessie" peaked at number 26, while "Beautiful in My Eyes" reached number 19 in 1994. The album was certified Gold in the United States in August 1994, and Platinum the following April.

Critical reception
Reviewing the album for AllMusic, Bryan Buss called it "chock full of odes to finding romance, longing for romance and losing romance". Music & Media wrote, "Whereas most singer/songwriters operate in the cult hero circle, Kadison has an unmistakable ACE potential. The single Jessie could tear down walls like Walking In Memphis did for Marc Cohn. Those who even think that that's too left of centre should recognise that his voice comes close to Billy Joel and most of all to Elton John. The track Beau's All Night Radio Love Line is the finest about this delicate subject since Ben Vaughn's The Apology Line."

Track listing
All songs written by Joshua Kadison.
"Jessie" – 5:19
"Painted Desert Serenade" – 2:56
"Beau's All Night Radio Love Line" – 4:26
"Invisible Man" – 4:57
"Mama's Arms" – 3:00
"Beautiful in My Eyes" – 4:07
"Picture Postcards from LA" – 4:33
"When a Woman Cries" – 3:31
"Georgia Rain" – 4:03

Personnel 
 Joshua Kadison – vocals, acoustic piano 
 Rod Argent – keyboards (1, 3, 4, 6, 7), Hammond B3 organ (8)
 Phil Parlapiano – accordion (2)
 CJ Vanston – Hammond B3 organ (9)
 Mark Cresswell – guitars (1), acoustic guitar (6, 7)
 Tim Pierce – guitars (2, 9)
 Clem Clempson – acoustic guitar (3, 4, 8), 12-string guitar (3), mandolin (3), electric guitar (7)
 Tim Renwick – electric guitar (8)
 John Pierce – bass guitar (2, 3, 9)
 John Giblin – acoustic bass (4), bass guitar (8)
 Peter Van Hooke – drums (1, 3, 6, 7), percussion (1, 3, 4, 6, 7, 8)
 Denny Fongheiser – drums (2, 9)
 Ian Thomas – drums (4)
 Neal Wilkinson – drums (8)
 Martin Ditcham – additional percussion (1), percussion (4, 7, 8)
 Frank Ricotti – congas (1, 7), additional percussion (1), percussion (4, 7)
 Susie Hanson – viola (2)
 Paul Jones – harmonica (3)
 Richard Morgan – oboe (4)
 Lance Ellington – harmony vocals (5)
 Carol Kenyon – harmony vocals (5)
 Ruby Turner – harmony vocals (5)
 Tessa Niles – backing vocals (7)
 Gene Miller – backing vocals (9)

String Quartet (Track 4)
 Rod Argent – arrangements
 Gavyn Wright – conductor, violin 
 Roger Smith – cello
 George Robertson – viola 
 Wilfred Gibson – violin 

Strings (Tracks 6 & 8)
 Rod Argent – arrangements 
 Gavyn Wright – conductor 
 Chris Laurence – double bass 
 Paul Kegg, Ben Kennard, Helen Liebmann and Roger Smith – celli
 Susie Hansen, Andrew Parker, George Robertson, Robert Smissen and Stephen Tees – viola 
 Mark Berrow, Ben Cruft, Roger Garland, Wilfred Gibson, Roy Gillard, Tim Good, Rita Manning, Peter Oxer, Bill Penham, Barry Wilde, David Woodcock and Gavyn Wright – violin 

Choir (Track 6)
 Rod Argent, Adele Bertei, Lance Ellington, Carol Kenyon, David Lasley, Ian Shaw, Helen Terry and Ruby Turner

Choir (Track 9)
 Sherwood Ball,  Carmen Carter,  Kathy Hazzard, Valerie Mayo, Arnold McCuller, Joseph Powell, Carmen Twillie and Fred White

 Production 
 Rod Argent – producer (1, 3-8)
 Peter Van Hooke – producer (1, 3-8)
 David Kershenbaum – producer (2, 9), mixing (1, 2, 3, 6, 7, 9)
 Brian Koppelman – A&R
 Simon Smart – engineer (1, 3-8)
 Kevin Smith – mixing (1, 2, 3, 6, 7, 9), engineer (2, 9)
 John Kurlander – string recording (4, 6, 8)
 Rob Eaton – mixing (4, 5, 8)
 Bob Ludwig – mastering 
 Nick Bode – art direction, design, management
 Annalisa Pessin – photography Studios'''
 Recorded at Red House Studios (Bedfordshire, UK); Westside Studios and Abbey Road Studios (London, UK); The Mill Studios (Cookham, UK); Music Grinder Studios (Hollywood, California); Track Record Studios and Pacifique Studios (North Hollywood, California).
 Mastered at Masterdisk (Hollywood, California).

Charts

Weekly charts

Year-end charts

Certifications

References

1993 debut albums
Joshua Kadison albums
Capitol Records albums
SBK Records albums
Albums produced by Rod Argent
Albums produced by David Kershenbaum